Destiny is an online-only multiplayer first-person shooter video game series developed by Bungie and previously published by Activision. The series is now self-published by Bungie after separating from Activision in 2019. Destiny marked Bungie's first new console franchise since the Halo series. Set in a "mythic science fiction" world, the series features a multiplayer "shared-world" environment with elements of role-playing games. Activities are divided among player versus environment (PvE) and player versus player (PvP) game types. In addition to normal story missions, PvE features three-player "strikes" and dungeons and six-player raids. A free roam patrol mode is also available for each destination which feature public events. PvP features objective-based modes, as well as traditional deathmatch game modes.

Players take on the role of a Guardian, protectors of Earth's last safe city as they wield a power called Light, granted by a celestial being called the Traveler, to protect the City from different alien races. Guardians journey to different planets to investigate and destroy the alien threats before humanity is completely wiped out, while also engaging in an intergalactic war against the Traveler's ancient enemy, the Darkness—Guardians also later learn to control and use its power. 

The first game in the series was Destiny, which released in September 2014 for the PlayStation 3, PlayStation 4, Xbox 360, and Xbox One. Over the course of its three-year lifecycle, four expansion packs were released. A sequel, Destiny 2, released in September 2017 for the PlayStation 4 and Xbox One, followed by a Microsoft Windows version the following month. It has since been released on Google Stadia, PlayStation 5, and the Xbox Series X/S platforms. Thus far, Destiny 2 has had six expansion packs, with two more planned for release in 2023 and 2024, which will conclude the first saga of the franchise. Additionally, the second year of the game's lifecycle introduced seasonal content—extra downloadable content released periodically throughout the year between each major expansion. Also, in October 2019, the base game of Destiny 2 was re-released as a free-to-play title called Destiny 2: New Light, adopting the games as a service model, with only the expansions and seasonal passes requiring purchasing.

Setting
Bungie described the setting of Destiny as a "mythic science-fiction" world. The setting, about 700 years in the future, follows a prosperous period of exploration, peace, and technological advancement known as the Golden Age. In a universe where humans have spread out and colonized planets in the Solar System, an event known as "the Collapse" saw the mysterious dissolution of these colonies, the end of the Golden Age, and mankind teetering on the brink of extinction. The only known survivors of the Collapse are those living on Earth, who were saved by "the Traveler", a white, spherical celestial body whose appearance centuries before had enabled humans to reach the stars. The Collapse was caused by a mysterious force called the Darkness, an ancient enemy of the Traveler that plagues the galaxy. The Traveler now hovers above the last safe city on Earth, simply called The Last City, which is surrounded by a massive Wall, and its presence allows the Guardians — the defenders of the City — the ability to wield an unknown power, only referred to as "Light". The player takes on the role of a Guardian, and is tasked with reviving the Traveler while investigating and destroying alien threats before humanity is completely wiped out.

Upon mankind's first attempt to repopulate and reconstruct after the Collapse, it is discovered that hostile alien races have occupied mankind's former colonies and civilizations, and are now encroaching upon the City. Throughout the series, players have to combat aggressive aliens who have occupied the Solar System. Just like the Light for the Guardians, the Darkness lends powers to these alien threats. The powers of Light and Darkness are discovered to be forms of paracausal energy that gives their wielders the ability to bend the laws of reality to their own will.

Both games use settings on various planets, moons and other features within the Solar System as the Guardians fight to defend the remnants of the Golden Age. Destiny featured maps across Earth, the Moon, Venus, and Mars, and included player-versus-player maps set on Phobos and Mercury. Destiny 2, prior to the Beyond Light expansion, included Earth, the Moon, Mercury, Mars, Nessus, Io, Titan, and the Tangled Shore/Dreaming City, areas situated along the Reef, the System's asteroid belt. With Beyond Light, Bungie opted to create a Destiny Content Vault, placing Mercury, Mars, Io, and Titan content within it to start, as a means to better manage the game's future expansions. Bungie does plan to revise vaulted content as the series progresses to re-introduce these into the game. Beyond Light also reintroduced the Cosmodrome from Earth from Destiny as well as a new location Europa, and a new social space in the Tower called the H.E.L.M. (Hub for Emergency Maneuvers and Logistics). The Witch Queen added a third social space, the Enclave, on Mars, as well as a new location, Savathûn's Throne World, within the Ascendant Realm. Lightfall will add a new location, the secret technologically advanced city of Neomuna, on Neptune.

Characters
The expansive universe of Destiny features numerous recurring non-player characters to assist the Guardian. Several provide the player with quests while others are vendors to buy new gear using the in-game currency of glimmer. Most of these characters are human or of two subspecies: the Awoken, descendants of a human colony ship that had encountered a phenomenon in deep space that caused them to become more enlightened to paracausal forces while giving them blue-gray skin and other elf-like features, and Exo, robotic shells housing human consciousness developed by Braytech Industries as to try to give humans immortality but require their memories to be occasionally wiped to prevent them from going insane.

The Guardians are led by the Vanguard that oversees their activities. Among their leaders include the Speaker (voiced by Bill Nighy) who was the head of the Vanguard and who speaks for the Traveler; Titan Vanguard Commander Zavala (voiced by Lance Reddick) who oversees most of the Vanguard's military operations; the Warlock Vanguard Ikora Rey (initially voiced by Gina Torres, now by Mara Junot) who instructs the Hidden, the Vanguard's network of scouts and spies to track enemy movements; and the late Hunter Vanguard Cayde-6 (voiced by Nathan Fillion) who was a happy-go-lucky Exo and sharpshooter that assisted across various Vanguard functions; Cayde-6 was killed during the Destiny 2: Forsaken story content, his death having a lingering effect on the other characters. Other key members of the Vanguard include Lord Shaxx (voiced by Lennie James) who oversees the Crucible activities, Saint-14 (voiced by Brian T. Delaney) who is a fabled Titan of the past and rescued from death through time travel that manages the Trials of Osiris matches, and Iron Lord Saladin Forge (voiced by Keith Ferguson) who had helped to end the conflict necessary to make the Last City a possibility. The Vanguard also govern the Last City in the Consensus alongside three factions of citizens: the Future War Cult led by Lakshmi-2 (voiced by Shohreh Aghdashloo) which has used Vex technology to see constant conflict in the Last City's future and thus maintain preparedness for this, Dead Orbit led by Arach Jalaal (voiced by Peter Stormare) which believe that humanity must abandoned the System and colonies planets outside it, and New Monarchy led by Executor Hideo (voiced by James Remar) which seek to replace the current democratic leadership of the Vanguard with a single powerful ruler.

Among other major recurring allied characters include former Warlock Vanguard Osiris (voiced by Oded Fehr) who had been exiled after he became obsessed in studying the Vex but has since returned; Eris Morn (voiced by Morla Gorrondona), a former Hunter that has studied the Hive and the threat of Darkness; Ana Bray (initially voiced by Jamie Chung, now by Erika Ishii), the granddaughter of Braytech's founder Clovis Bray I, and helped to create the automated system defense Warmind Rasputin; Asher Mir (voiced by Darryl Kurylo), a scientist who has been tested on and partially converted to Vex and keen on studying how to reverse his conditions; Sloane (voiced by Cissy Jones), a Titan who served under Zavala and took to monitoring activities on Titan once it was re-secured; Shaw Han (voiced by Cory Yee), a Hunter who oversees operations within Earth's Cosmodrome; and Crow (voiced by Brandon O'Neill), a Guardian who was formerly the Awoken Prince Uldren Sov. The Vanguard is also aided by non-Guardian humans or allies, including: Amanda Holliday (voiced by Courtenay Taylor) who runs flights and transit operations for missions; Devrim Kay (voiced by Gideon Emery), a former Last City militia who maintains watch over the European Dead Zone; Brother Vance (voiced by Bob O'Donnell), a devote disciple of Osiris and oversees the Lighthouse on Mercury; Failsafe (voiced by Joy Osmanski), an artificial intelligence with a split personality from the starship Exodus Black that had crashed centuries before on the centaur planet Nessus; and Petra Venj (voiced by April Stewart), the Awoken Last City ambassador of Queen Mara Sov of the Reef (voiced by Kirsten Potter) and who monitors activities in the Dreaming City. Further, the Guardians are aided by the Drifter (voiced by Todd Haberkorn), who oversees the Gambit activities; Banshee-44 (voiced by John DiMaggio), the Tower's gunsmith; Ada-1 (voiced by Britt Baron), the curator of the Black Armory weapon foundry who handles armor transmogrification for players; Eva Levante (voiced by Nika Futterman), the Guardian outfitter who later becomes the Tower's seasonal vendor; Tess Everis (voiced by Claudia Black), the vendor for the Eververse microtransaction store; the Exo Stranger (initially voiced by Lauren Cohan, now by Moira Quirk), also known as Elisabeth "Elsie" Bray, who is the sister of Ana Bray who first helped the Guardian destroy the Black Heart; Xûr (voiced by Fred Tatasciore), a strange vendor of exotic wares who speaks for the Nine, dark matter beings trapped in the System's gravity well for eons and have watched humanity developed; Fynch (voiced by Ian James Corlett), a Ghost who regrets joining the Hive and guides the Guardian in Savathûn's Throne World; and Nimbus (voiced by Marin Miller), who is one of the Cloud Striders, the cybernetically-enhanced defenders of Neomuna, alongside their mentor Rohan (voiced by Dave Fennoy) and who guides the Guardian on Neptune.

Alien races
Multiple alien races have been introduced in the series. Five were originally introduced with Destiny while the sixth race, the Scorn, was introduced within Destiny 2: Forsaken. 
 The Fallen, also known as the Eliksni, are an insectoid race of nomadic pirates who scavenge ruined settlements on Earth, Earth's Moon, and Venus for resources. The Fallen are split among several tribal-like Houses, each with its own leader known as a Kell. Long before the Traveler arrived in the System, it had visited the Fallen's home world of Riis and similarly gave rise to a golden age, where they worshipped it as their "Great Machine". In the midst of this age, the Traveler suddenly left them, and their society fell apart as Houses turned against each other. The survivors abandoned the planet to seek out the Traveler, following it to Earth and scavenging whatever technology they could along the way. Rise of Iron added a faction of Fallen called the Devil Splicers, which are Fallen who have been modified by a technological plague called SIVA. They are found on Earth in a zone outside of the Wall called the Plaguelands. During the course of events in Destiny 2, some of the Fallen Houses find that alliance with the Vanguard would become beneficial, while other Houses remain fully hostile to the Vanguard, such as Eramis, Kell of Darkness (voiced by Salli Saffioti) and House Salvation on Europa. Among those that have allied with the Vanguard include Variks (voiced by Dee Bradley Baker), the former Warden of the Prison of Elders; Mithrax (voiced by Ray Chase), the Kell of House Light who also has learned how to master hacking into the Vex network; Eido (voiced by Maya Aoki Tuttle), Mithrax's daughter and the scribe of House Light; and Spider (voiced by Robin Atkin Downes), a black market trader operating from the Tangled Shore.
 The Hive are a macabre race of ancient aliens who have created massive underground settlements beneath Earth and its Moon's surfaces, as well as on Saturn's moon Titan. The Hive originated from a planet called Fundament that had an inescapable gravity well, and the people that lived there, the Krill, eked out a living. One of the rulers, the Osmium King, was killed in a coup, and his three daughters, Aurash, Sathona, and Xi Ro, aware their own lives were in danger, discovered that five Worm Gods, disciples of the Darkness, were trapped in the core of Fundament by the Traveler. The three sisters vowed to help feed the Worm Gods under the principles of the Sword Logic in exchange for immortality and power. The three became the first Hive: respectively, Oryx, the Taken King; Savathûn, the Witch Queen (voiced by Debra Wilson); and Xivu Arath, the God of War. The three converted the Krill to Hive servants and found the means to escape Fundament and chase down the Traveler and its allies by allying with the Darkness. As revealed in The Witch Queen expansion, the Krill were to have been visited by the Traveler and were about to be granted a Golden Age, but the Witness (voiced by Brett Dalton), an agent of the Darkness, interceded to make Sathona distrust the Traveler and seek out the Worm Gods instead and turn to the Darkness. Even still, Savathûn eventually decided to abandon the Darkness and the Worm Gods by trying to get rid of her worm. Queen Mara Sov freed her from the worm but then also attacked her. Savathûn was fatally injured but managed to flee the scene and ended up dying in the Last City after speaking with the Traveler. She was then resurrected by a Ghost, Immaru, becoming a Lightbearer.
 The Vex are semi-organic androids who are attempting to seize control of Venus, Mars, and the Jovian moon Io by turning them into their machines, which they have already done to Mercury and later the centaur planet Nessus. Vex are actually millions of microscopic artificial organisms that are linked via a giant mind network and survive in an organic fluid called radiolaria; each individual Vex android hosts a number of these organisms in its core. Because of their massive processing power, the Vex are constantly running simulations of the past, present, and future to try to outmaneuver their enemies in their goal to convert the entire universe to Vex, and have mastered some elements of time travel. Alongside the Hive, the Vex worship the Darkness and are one of their most dangerous allies.
 The Cabal are a military-industrial empire of gigantic amphibians who continue to expand their galactic empire from their homeworld of Torobatl, comparable to the Roman Empire. Within Destiny, they have secured bases on Mars as scouting posts for a potential invasion of Earth. The Cabal become more central within the "Red War" plot of Destiny 2, as their leader, Dominus Ghaul (voiced by Neil Kaplan), sought to capture the Traveler and draw out the Light for himself and destroy the System, but ultimately was defeated and destroyed. Later, the System is visited by the former exiled Emperor Calus (voiced by Darin De Paul) aboard the Leviathan, who tries to seek a tenacious alliance with the Vanguard after seeing portents of upcoming threats by the Darkness. The Cabal's homeworld of Torobatl was eventually invaded by Xivu Arath, the God of War, and her Hive forces, with some of the Cabal falling under her control, forcing them to flee Torobatl and their current leader and Calus' daughter, Empress Caiatl (voiced by Courtenay Taylor), was forced to seek alliances to help with fighting their homeworld battles.  
 The Taken, a race introduced in The Taken King, are ghostly-looking corrupted versions of regular enemies, who infest areas on every planet. Oryx, the Taken King, was granted the ability to create his Taken army by drawing foes into the Ascendant Plane, which granted them new paracausal powers but drained them of their individuality and compelled to serve the one that created them. Other major enemies have since been able to create their own armies of Taken forces.
 The Scorn, a race introduced in Forsaken, are undead Fallen, reanimated through a substance called Dark Ether. The reanimation process leaves them loyal to the Scorned Barons, led by Fikrul, the Fanatic (voiced by Matthew Mercer). The Scorned Barons are from an exiled house of the Fallen who have occupied the Tangled Shore (the Solar System's asteroid belt) and the Dreaming City and seek revenge against the Fallen, the Awoken, and certain Guardians. As revealed in The Witch Queen expansion, the Scorn are now being controlled by the Witness through one of its Disciples, Rhulk (voiced by Andrew Morgado).

Every race utilizes different tactics and weapons in combat. The Fallen possess cloaking and short-range teleportation technologies to increase their mobility. The Hive use superior numbers to overwhelm their opponents in close quarters while more elite units attack from a distance. The Vex utilize hard-light shields and teleport units of infantry into the battlefield en-masse. The Cabal rely on heavy armor, ballistic shields, and jump packs to combat players. The Taken, in addition to all the other races specialties, use high mobility and plenty of long-range attacks to out-maneuver the player. The Scorn, in addition to similarities to the Fallen, do not take cover and have the most aggressive artificial intelligence, with the ability from Dark Ether to move incorporeally a short distance to evade damage. All of these races are hostile towards each other (with the exception of the Hive and the Taken), as they can often be observed attacking one another in-game for territorial dominance. 

In the original game, the majority of the lore, which details backstory on characters, weapons, the alien races, planets, etc., was found in Grimoire cards collected throughout the game but could only be accessed through Bungie's website and the Destiny app. In Destiny 2, lore can be read through dedicated lore books in an in-game menu, as well as through lore tabs on various gear found throughout the game. There are also various scannable items found on the different planets that contain lore-related information.

Gameplay

The Destiny series is primarily a first-person shooter, with the player taking the role of a Guardian, a person granted powers of Light by the Traveler. The player chooses from one of three main character classes: Titans who specialize in melee and defense, Hunters who can dodge and use stealth to their advantage, and Warlocks that harness the power of Light into magic-like abilities. Each class can use the Light along three separate elemental archetypes of Light power, Arc, Solar, and Void, along with further subclasses of each that affect certain aspects of those powers. A fourth elemental power, Stasis, was introduced with Destiny 2: Beyond Light, while a fifth elemental power, Strand, will be introduced with Destiny 2: Lightfall. These powers give abilities such as grenades and defensive options, as well as a powerful Super ability which requires a long cooldown before it can be cast again. Along with these powers, the player's Guardian is supported by a Ghost, an artificial intelligence that accompanies the Guardian and imbued with limited power of the Traveler to resurrect the Guardian should they die in combat in most cases. Only in certain restricted areas, where the powers of Darkness overwhelm the Light, the Ghost cannot revive the player.

In addition to their Light abilities, the Guardian gains access to an arsenal of weapons and armor to help in their fight. Weapons, which include numerous varieties of guns as well as bows, swords, grenade and rocket launchers, fall into three classes of Kinetic (which lack elemental damage), Energy (which are tuned to one specific element), and Power weapons (which do larges amounts of damage but typically limited in ammo supply), with the Guardian able to equip one of each in combat. Armor pieces can be mixed to adjust the Guardian's innate attributes such as defense, melee attack power, and rate of cooldown for abilities. The Guardian's effectiveness in combat is also affected by their light or power level, measured as an average of the light level of all currently equipped gear. As the player completes activities, they can gain engrams that are decrypted into new weapons or armor pieces of higher light level to help raise their Guardian's level. Certain weapons and armor pieces are considered exotic, providing a unique ability over other weapons or armor. Because of this advantage, players are only able to equip one exotic weapon and one exotic armor piece at a time.

Content in Destiny includes both single-player, cooperative multiplayer and competitive multiplayer modes. The games include a story mode where the player completes various missions, gaining rewards while progressing the lore within the game. Cooperative activities like strikes and seasonal events allow players to matchmake with friends or within their clan, or offer random matchmaking in game. More involved activities include dungeons and raids, typically requiring more coordination between members, and require players to group up before starting. Competitive modes include matches in the Crucible and, within Destiny 2, Gambit, a team-based multiplayer mode. Nearly all activities are repeatable, allowing for players to continue build experience and obtain rewards.

Both Destiny and Destiny 2 have used expansions to add in new content to the game, including new weapons and armor, new story-driven missions, and new activities. Within Destiny 2, Bungie has since adopted a seasonal approach, with approximately one major expansion each year along with four seasons of additional content.

History
Prior to developing Destiny, Bungie had developed an early first-person shooter series with the Marathon Trilogy, released between 1994 and 1996. One facet that Bungie brought to this developing genre was the integration of lore-heavy story alongside the action gameplay; players could read logs and messages from various terminals scatters around the maps, which featured a story about humanity in conflict with alien races and rogue artificial intelligences. Another key game in Bungie's history was the first several games in the Halo series. Halo was used as a flagship title for the Xbox console by Microsoft, which had acquired Bungie as an internal studio in 2000 for its development. Halo is also a first-person shooter series and including both a mythos-heavy single-player story mode as well as online multiplayer modes. Bungie split off from Microsoft in 2007, and supported the next few games in the Halo series through 2010 before Microsoft transitioned the development to 343 Industries.

During this period of transition, Bungie began laying the groundwork for their next game which would become Destiny. According to COO Pete Parsons, Bungie knew they could create works that would enter the popular culture as they had with Halo, but they wanted to go for something more epic with this game; "We like to tell big stories and we want people to put the Destiny universe on the same shelf they put Lord of the Rings, Harry Potter or Star Wars; we've already seen they do that with Halo." Bungie had planned for Destiny to be the first "shared-world shooter", with players often engaging with other players on the same service in cooperative or competitive activities in an always-online fashion. Destiny was formally revealed in 2013, alongside news that Activision would help Bungie to publish the title. Though the game was released in 2014, it did not have numerous issues in the years prior; as documented by Jason Schreier from Kotaku, numerous changes were made in the game's story and approach around 2013, including dumping much of the story written to that point. This resulted in the initial release of Destiny to be lack-luster due to what appeared to be unfinished and inconsistent parts of the game's story. Bungie worked to improve the game through its expansions in the following years.

Alongside work on expansions, Bungie also began planning towards Destinys sequel shortly after the first game's release. Destiny 2 was released in 2017, and in addition to console platforms, was also released for Microsoft Windows through Activision's Battle.net distribution system. In 2018, Bungie announced they had amicably agreed with Activision to break the long-term publishing contract they had, and would proceed to distribute Destiny 2 on their own, transitioning the Windows version to Steam over several months.

Games and expansion packs

Destiny
Destiny released worldwide for the PlayStation 3, PlayStation 4, Xbox 360, and Xbox One on September 9, 2014. While the majority of the game served to set up the Destiny universe, the main conflict was with the Vex, wherein the Guardian entered into the Black Garden on Mars to destroy the Heart of the Black Garden, lifting the shroud of Darkness from the Traveler back on Earth. This was followed up by a raid, the "Vault of Glass," where a fireteam of Guardians entered the Vex construct to face Atheon, Time's Conflux, a central figure of the Vex Conflux network.
Destiny: The Dark Below was the first expansion pack for the game. A minor expansion, it released on December 9, 2014. The story centers on the Hive race and their deity Crota, Son of Oryx, who had been referenced in the original game. The Hive are attempting to resurrect Crota. The story culminates with the raid, "Crota's End," where a fireteam of Guardians descend deep into the caverns of the Moon to eliminate the Hive prince.
Destiny: House of Wolves was the second expansion pack. Another minor expansion, it released on May 19, 2015. The story centers on the Fallen race, as players attempt to thwart a campaign by Skolas, Kell of Kells, to unite the Fallen race under his rule. Instead of a raid, the expansion added a new three-player PvE cooperative mode called Prison of Elders. In the level 35 difficulty of the mode called "Skolas's Revenge," a fireteam of Guardians enter into Skolas's lockup, after capturing the Kell, to execute him for his crimes.
Destiny: The Taken King was the third expansion and the first major expansion for the game. Released on September 15, 2015, it had the largest effect on the game, overhauling many of its features. It also introduced a new subclass for each class. The story revolves around Oryx, The Taken King, and his plot for revenge after the Guardians slew his son Crota in The Dark Below. The expansion added a new race of enemy called the Taken, Oryx's warriors that have been altered by the Darkness—the Taken are corrupted versions of the other races in the game. The expansion culminates in the raid, "King's Fall," where a fireteam of Guardians board Oryx's Dreadnaught ship to eliminate The Taken King.
Destiny: Rise of Iron was the fourth and last major expansion of the original Destiny. It released on September 20, 2016, but only for the PlayStation 4 and Xbox One versions of the game; aside from updates to address software bugs, the PlayStation 3 and Xbox 360 clients stopped receiving content updates. The story revolves around the Fallen, as they have breached the Wall that surrounds Earth's last safe city and are utilizing the SIVA virus, a Golden Age nanotechnology characterized by self-replication and self-assembly. Lord Saladin, the last known remaining Iron Lord, guides players to become a new generation of Iron Lords and wipe out SIVA. The expansion culminates in the raid, "Wrath of the Machine," where a fireteam of Guardians enter into the breached wall to eliminate Aksis, Archon Prime, and end the SIVA threat.

Destiny 2
Destiny 2 released worldwide for the PlayStation 4 and Xbox One on September 6, 2017, followed by a Microsoft Windows version the following month. It was then released on Google Stadia in October 2019, and then the PlayStation 5 and Xbox Series X/S platforms in November 2020. Also on October 1, 2019, Destiny 2 was re-released as a free-to-play title called Destiny 2: New Light. The original story of Destiny 2s base game revolved around the Cabal race and their leader, Dominus Ghaul, in his attempt to legitimize himself as the Emperor of the Cabal, a conflict called The Red War. Ghaul manages to strip the Guardians of their Light. After regaining their power, the Guardians face Ghaul in a final showdown, which results in the Traveler awakening and completely destroying Ghaul. Afterwards, a large ship called the Leviathan enters into the Solar System above Nessus' orbit. The former Emperor, Calus, invites a fireteam of Guardians to board his ship ("Leviathan" raid) to complete a series of challenges. In November 2020, Destiny 2 went through a major overhaul and nearly half of the content from its first three years were removed from the game and placed into the Destiny Content Vault. This included Destiny 2s base campaign, The Red War. Replacing this is a campaign to introduce new players to the world of Destiny. New players are introduced to a new character named Shaw Han, who guides players on a quest through the Russian Cosmodrome on Earth, battling Fallen and Hive.
Destiny 2: Curse of Osiris was a small expansion, but the first for Destiny 2, released on December 5, 2017. The expansion focused on the legendary Warlock Osiris from the lore of the original Destiny. He has returned to reality from his time spent in the Infinite Forest on Mercury as he has seen a dark future where there is no Light or Darkness and the Vex reign supreme. The Guardian then helps Osiris to stop Panoptes, Infinite Mind, from preventing the dark future. Following this, Emperor Calus extends another invitation to travel to the Leviathan on Nessus, where a fireteam of Guardians venture deep into the Leviathan's core to eliminate Argos, Planetary Core, the Vex Mind which was responsible for the transformation of Nessus ("Leviathan: Eater of Worlds" raid lair). The contents of this expansion were also removed and placed into the Destiny Content Vault in November 2020.
Destiny 2: Warmind was also a small expansion, and the second for Destiny 2, released on May 8, 2018. The expansion focused on the Warmind Rasputin from the original game. Assisting the Hunter Guardian Ana Bray, the Guardian helps Ana in stopping a Hive worm god called Xol, Will of the Thousands, from attacking the Bray Research facility and destroying Rasputin. Following Xol's defeat, the remnants of the Red Legion, led by Val Ca'uor, assault the Leviathan in an attempt to assassinate Emperor Calus, who once again calls upon Guardians to his aid to eliminate Val Ca'uor ("Leviathan: Spire of Stars" raid lair). The contents of this expansion were also removed and placed into the Destiny Content Vault in November 2020.
Destiny 2: Forsaken was the third expansion, but the first major expansion for Destiny 2. It released on September 4, 2018 and had a major overhaul on the game. Additionally, an Annual Pass was available, which began the seasonal content model for Destiny 2. The first season was Season of the Outlaw, which began alongside Forsaken. The first seasonal content drop of the Annual Pass was Season of the Forge in December 2018, followed by Season of the Drifter in March 2019, and then Season of Opulence in June 2019. The story of Forsaken revolves around the player's Guardian seeking to avenge the death of Cayde-6 by the hands of Prince Uldren Sov. Uldren, corrupted by the Darkness, is in search of his lost sister, Queen Mara Sov, both of whom were thought to have died in The Taken King. Along their journey, players face the Scorn, undead versions of the Fallen race that have been revived and morphed into a new race. The expansion culminates in the raid, "Last Wish," where a fireteam of Guardians set out to eliminate Riven of a Thousand Voices, a wish dragon called an Ahamkara who was responsible for corrupting Uldren.
Destiny 2: Shadowkeep was the next major expansion. A large expansion that released on October 1, 2019, it had four seasonal content offerings. The first, Season of the Undying, was available alongside the expansion's release. This was followed up by Season of Dawn in December 2019, then Season of the Worthy in March 2020, and finally Season of Arrivals in June 2020. The story of Shadowkeep sees the return of Eris Morn, who had been absent since the events of The Red War. Eris seeks the help of the Guardian in defeating "Nightmares" that she released into the Solar System, which are manifestations of the Guardian's past. Players face off against their previous adversaries, which are being resurrected by the Darkness. Throughout the story, Eris and the Guardian work together to figure out the cause of this unleashed madness and do what they can to put a stop to it. The expansion culminates in the raid, "Garden of Salvation," where a fireteam of Guardians face off against the Vex, with a final fight against the Sanctified Mind, Sol Inherent; through this, they learn that the Darkness has been sending messages, which Eris dismisses as attempts of manipulation by the Darkness.
Destiny 2: Beyond Light was the fifth expansion released on November 10, 2020. Bungie described this expansion as the start of a new era in the franchise. It has had the largest effect on the game thus far, changing many aspects as well as removing nearly half of the game's content from the first three years of Destiny 2. It also has four seasonal content offerings. The first, Season of the Hunt, was available alongside the expansion's release. This was followed up by Season of the Chosen in February 2021, then Season of the Splicer in May 2021, and finally Season of the Lost in August 2021. In Beyond Light, the Guardian travels to Jupiter's icy moon Europa to confront the Fallen Kell Eramis, who plans to use the power of the Darkness to save her people and take revenge on the Traveler back on Earth, as she and many Fallen believe that the Traveler had abandoned them before the Golden Age of humanity. The player's Guardian also obtains this Darkness-based power as a subclass called Stasis, which features ice-based abilities. The expansion sees the return of the Exo Stranger from the original Destinys campaign, as well as Variks from House of Wolves, both of which guides the Guardian on Europa. After stopping Eramis, the expansion culminates in the raid, "Deep Stone Crypt," where a fireteam of Guardians enter the fabled crypt to prevent the Fallen from using its technology, resulting in a showdown with Taniks, the Abomination.
Destiny 2: The Witch Queen was the sixth expansion released on February 22, 2022. It was originally planned for release in late 2021, but due to the impact of the COVID-19 pandemic, the expansion was delayed by six months. The expansion revolves around the sister of Oryx, Savathûn the titular Witch Queen. It has four planned seasons of content to be released throughout the year. The first, Season of the Risen, was made available alongside the expansion's release. It was followed up by Season of the Haunted in May 2022, then Season of Plunder in August 2022 and finally, Season of the Seraph released in December 2022. Upon release, all of Year 4's seasonal content were removed, except for Season 13's Battlegrounds activity, and the Forsaken campaign were removed, along with the Tangled Shore destination. In The Witch Queen, the Guardian discovers that Savathûn is able to wield the power of Light and has used it to infuse her Hive warriors, known as the Lucent Brood, with powers similar to that of the Guardians. The Guardian travels to Savathûn's Throne World in the Ascendant Realm to investigate on how she stole the Light. The expansion also sees the debut of a brand new character, a Hive Ghost named Fynch, who guides the Guardian in Savathûn's Throne World. After defeating Savathûn, the expansion culminates in the raid, "Vow of the Disciple", where a fireteam of Guardians investigate a sunken Pyramid ship in the outskirts of the Throne World, where they face off against the Scorn and the Taken, controlled by Rhulk, Disciple of the Witness, who the Guardians face off against at the end of the raid; through Rhulk's defeat, the Guardians eliminate a major threat of the Witness, the leader of the Black Fleet who controls the Darkness and is responsible for the ascension of the Hive.
Destiny 2: Lightfall was the seventh expansion released on February 28, 2023. Similar to The Witch Queen, it was originally planned for release in late 2022 but was delayed to early 2023 due to the COVID-19 pandemic. It will have four seasonal content offerings to be released throughout 2023. The expansion will revolve around the Witness and its newest Disciple, Emperor Calus, as they assault the secret, technologically advanced human city of Neomuna on Neptune, enroute to destroy the Traveler in the Last City. In Lightfall, the player's Guardian travels to Neomuna to intercept the Witness and Emperor Calus and their army of Shadow Legion Cabal and Pyramid Tormentors and prevent their advance. The Guardian also discovers a brand new Darkness-based power as a subclass called Strand, which features psychic energy-based abilities that also allows them to traverse the Neomuna skyline. The expansion will see the introduction a brand new allied race called the Cloud Striders, the human defenders of Neomuna who have voluntarily undergone cybernetic augmentation at the cost of significantly reducing their lifespan. One such Cloud Strider, Nimbus, will be a brand new character debuting in Lightfall, who will guide the Guardian on Neomuna.
One further expansion, Destiny 2: The Final Shape, is planned for release in 2024.

References

 
Action role-playing video games by series
Activision games
First-person shooter multiplayer online games
First-person shooters by series
Loot shooters
Post-apocalyptic video games
Role-playing video games by series
Science fantasy video games
Video game franchises
Video game franchises introduced in 2014
Video games about cyborgs
Video games about extraterrestrial life
Video games about robots
Planetary romances